Crassispira xanti is a species of sea snail, a marine gastropod mollusk in the family Pseudomelatomidae.

Description
The length of the shell attains 15 mm.

Distribution
This marine species occurs from Baja California, Mexico to Panama

References

 Hertlein, L. G. and A. M. Strong. 1951. Eastern Pacific expeditions of the New York Zoological Society. XLIII. Mollusks from the west coast of Mexico and Central America. Part X. New York Zoological Society, Zoologica 36(2): 66 120, 11 pls.

External links
 Biolib.cz: Crassispira xanti
 
 

xanti
Gastropods described in 1951